The 22501/02 New Tinsukia–SMVT Bengaluru Weekly Express is a weekly train which connects Tinsukia, the easternmost town of Assam with the South Indian Metropolis of Bengaluru. The train consists of AC 1st class, 2-tier, 3-tier and sleeper-class coaches. It is 6th longest train service of Indian Railways, as of 2023, which travels a total distance of 3543 kilometres.

Time-table 
Train no. 22502 from New Tinsukia to Bengaluru.
Train no. 22501 from Bengaluru to New Tinsukia.

Major halts
KARNATAKA
 Sir M. Visvesvaraya Terminal (Starts)
   
 

TAMIL NADU
 
 
 Perambur (Chennai)

ANDHRA PRADESH 
 
 
 
 
 
 

ODISHA
 
 Balugaon
 
 
 
 

WEST BENGAL
 
 Dankuni (Kolkata)
 
 
 
 New Jalpaiguri (Siliguri)
 
 
 

BIHAR
 

NAGALAND
.

ASSAM
 
 Goalpara Town
 Guwahati Railway Station
Moranhat
Sivasagar
Simaluguri

 (Ends)

Locomotive
Than it is hauled by WAP-7 Locomotive of Electric Loco Shed, Howrah upto .

E-Catering
As of September 2022, The E-Catering facility for 22501 SMVT Bengaluru  New Tinsukia Weekly Express is available in following stations:

.

Similarly the E-Catering facility for 22502 New Tinsukia SMVT Bengaluru  Weekly Express is available in following stations:

 and
Sir M. Visvesvaraya Terminal

See also
Longest train services of Indian Railways
Dibrugarh–Tambaram Express
Chennai–New Jalpaiguri Superfast Express
Guwahati–Bengaluru Cantt. Superfast Express
Thiruvananthapuram–Silchar Superfast Express
Bangalore Cantonment–Agartala Humsafar Express

References

Transport in Tinsukia
Transport in Bangalore
Express trains in India
Rail transport in Assam
Rail transport in Nagaland
Rail transport in West Bengal
Rail transport in Bihar
Rail transport in Odisha
Rail transport in Andhra Pradesh
Rail transport in Tamil Nadu
Rail transport in Karnataka
Railway services introduced in 2010